Lipan may refer to:
 Lipan Apache people, an indigenous people of Texas and northern Mexico
 Lipan language
 Lipan, Texas, a city
 Lipan Independent School District
 Mereta, Texas or Lipan, an unincorporated community
 Lipan Point, a promontory of the Grand Canyon
 Lipán M3, an Argentine Army unmanned aerial vehicle
 USS Lipan (AT-85), a US Navy tug
 Battle of Lipany or Lipan, a 1434 battle of the Hussite Wars, fought near Prague

People with the surname
 Ovidiu Lipan (born 1953), Romanian drummer
 Teresa Lipan, a character in the Syphon Filter video game series
 Victoria Lipan, the protagonist of The Hatchet, a 1930 novel by Mihail Sadoveanu

See also
 Lipany (disambiguation)
 Lipiany (disambiguation)
 Lipiny (disambiguation)